Trump International Hotel may refer to:

Current

Five buildings are named Trump Hotels with four owned/operated by the Trump organization:

 Trump International Hotel and Tower (Chicago)
 Trump International Hotel and Tower (New York City)
 Trump International Hotel Las Vegas

Trump International Hotel and Tower (Honolulu) is a licensee and not owned directly.

Former names
 Conrad Fort Lauderdale, formerly known as Trump International Hotel and Tower Fort Lauderdale. Opened in 2017, the name was removed by Trump in 2009 and has never operated under the brand.
 The St. Regis Toronto, formerly known as Trump International Hotel and Tower Toronto from 2012 to 2017.
 JW Marriott Panama, formerly known as Trump International Hotel and Tower Panama. Opened in 2011, the name was dropped from the building in 2015 and hotel in 2018.
 Paradox Hotel Vancouver, formerly known as Trump International Hotel and Tower Vancouver. Opened in 2017, the hotel closed in August 2020 and re-opened in August 2022 with a new name and management, and all Trump branding removed from the building by the end of 2021.
 Waldorf Astoria Washington, D.C., formerly known as Trump International Hotel Washington DC from 2016 to 2022.

Unbuilt
 Trump International Hotel and Residence (Phoenix)
 Trump International Hotel and Tower (Baku)
 Trump International Hotel and Tower (Dubai)
 Trump International Hotel and Tower (New Orleans)

See also
 The Dominick, in SoHo, New York City (formerly the Trump SoHo)
 
 Trump Plaza (disambiguation)
 Trump Tower (disambiguation)

References